Sethi is a surname that is found among the Punjabi Khatris of India. They are a part of Khukhrain sub-caste among the Khatris which also includes the clans of Anand, Bhasin Chadha, Kohli, Ghai, Sahni, Sethi, (Sawhney) and Suri. The surname is also found among Arora which is another sub-caste of Khatris. Historian Kamal Shankar Srivastava writes that all Khukrains including Sethis were originally found near the banks of Indus and Jhelum river especially in the towns of Pind Dadan Khan, Peshawar and Nowshera.

Sethi is derived from the word "Sreshta" meaning "Pure" or "Superior" . Many Sethi Khatris adopted Sikhism.

Notable people 
 Akshay Sethi (born 1980), Indian television actor
 Aman Sethi, Indian journalist and writer
 Ali Sethi, Pakistani singer and author
 Arjun Sethi (entrepreneur), Indian American entrepreneur, investor and executive
 Arjun Singh Sethi, Indian American civil rights writer and lawyer
 Geet Sethi, Indian billiards player
 Kiran Sethi, Indian police officer
 Mira Sethi Pakistani Actress.
 Najam Sethi Senior Pakistani Journalist and former Chief Minister of Punjab Province in Pakistan during a caretaker Government, Chairman of Pakistan Cricket Board in 2022
 Nargis Sethi Senior Pakistani civil servant
 Prem Gopal "Biloo" Sethi, Indian golfer
 Parmeet Sethi, Indian actor
 Pramod Karan Sethi, Indian orthopaedic surgeon and coinventor of the Jaipur leg
 Rajeev Sethi, Indian art curator, scenographer and designer
 Ram Sethi, Indian actor-director-writer
 Ramesh Sethi, Kenyan cricketer
 Ramit Sethi, American entrepreneur and self proclaimed personal finance adviser
 Ravi Sethi, Indian computer scientist
 Ricky J. Sethi, Indian-American computational scientist
 Suresh P. Sethi, American mathematician and economist known for the Sethi model
 Vikas Sethi, Indian actor

See also
Sethia (surname)
Seth (surname)
Sheth

References 

Indian surnames
Pakistani names
Surnames of Indian origin
Punjabi tribes
Arora clans
Khatri clans
Khatri surnames
Punjabi-language surnames
Hindu surnames